The 2016 Pinty's All-Star Curling Skins Game was held from January 8 to 10 at The Fenlands Banff Recreation Centre in Banff, Alberta.

Men

Teams

Team Gushue
Bally Haly Golf & Curling Club, St. John's, Newfoundland and Labrador

Skip: Brad Gushue
Third: Mark Nichols
Second: Brett Gallant
Lead: Geoff Walker

Team Jacobs
Soo Curlers Association, Sault Ste. Marie, Ontario

Skip: Brad Jacobs
Third: Ryan Fry
Second: E. J. Harnden
Lead: Ryan Harnden

Team McEwen
Fort Rouge Curling Club, Winnipeg, Manitoba

Skip: Mike McEwen
Third: B. J. Neufeld
Second: Matt Wozniak
Lead: Denni Neufeld

Team Simmons
Glencoe Curling Club, Calgary, Alberta

Skip: Pat Simmons
Third: John Morris
Second: Carter Rycroft
Lead: Nolan Thiessen

Results
All times listed in Eastern Standard Time.

Semifinals
Gushue vs. Simmons
Saturday, January 9, 11:00 am

Jacobs vs. McEwen
Saturday, January 9, 9:00 pm

Final
Gushue vs. Jacobs
Sunday, January 10, 8:00 pm

Winnings
The prize winnings for each team are listed below:

Women

Teams

Team Homan
Ottawa Curling Club, Ottawa, Ontario

Skip: Rachel Homan
Third: Emma Miskew
Second: Joanne Courtney
Lead: Lisa Weagle

Team Jones
St. Vital Curling Club, Winnipeg, Manitoba

Skip: Jennifer Jones
Third: Kaitlyn Lawes
Second: Jill Officer
Lead: Dawn McEwen

Team Rocque
Saville Sports Centre, Edmonton, Alberta

Skip: Kelsey Rocque
Third: Laura Crocker
Second: Taylor McDonald
Lead: Jen Gates

Team Sweeting
Saville Sports Centre, Edmonton, Alberta

Skip: Val Sweeting
Third: Lori Olson-Johns
Second: Dana Ferguson
Lead: Rachelle Brown

Results
All times listed in Eastern Standard Time.

Semifinals
Homan vs. Sweeting
Friday, January 8, 8:00 pm

Jones vs. Rocque
Saturday, January 9, 4:00 pm

Final
Sweeting vs. Jones
Sunday, January 10, 1:00 pm

Winnings
The prize winnings for each team are listed below:

Notes

References

External links

2016 in Canadian curling
Banff, Alberta
Curling in Alberta
Pinty's All-Star Curling
TSN Skins Game
January 2016 sports events in Canada